Torgelower See is a lake in the Mecklenburgische Seenplatte district in Mecklenburg-Vorpommern, Germany. At an elevation of 38.6m, its surface area is 3.57 km².

Lakes of Mecklenburg-Western Pomerania
LTorgelowerSee